Georges Tabet (23 January 1905 – 28 February 1984) was a French Algerian actor, musician and screenwriter. During the 1930s he appeared frequently alongside Jacques Pills.

Selected filmography

Actor
 A Gentleman of the Ring (1932)
 Mademoiselle Josette, My Woman (1933)
 On the Road (1936)
 You Are Me (1936)
 Monsieur Fabre (1951)
 The Two Girls (1951)
 The Green Glove (1952)
 Stain in the Snow (1954)

Writer
 It's the Paris Life (1954)
 The Blue Danube (1955)
 Girls of the Night (1958)
 The Loves of Salammbo (1960)
 Les Yeux cernés (1964)
 La Grande Vadrouille (1966)
 The Oldest Profession (1967)
 The Heist (1970)
 The Lion's Share (1971)

References

Bibliography
 Goble, Alan. The Complete Index to Literary Sources in Film. Walter de Gruyter, 1999.

External links

1905 births
1984 deaths
Algerian male film actors
Algerian screenwriters
20th-century French screenwriters
French male film actors
People from Algiers
Pieds-Noirs